Ben 10: Ultimate Alien is an American animated television series, the third entry in Cartoon Network's Ben 10 franchise created by team Man of Action (a group consisting of Duncan Rouleau, Joe Casey, Joe Kelly, and Steven T. Seagle), and produced by Cartoon Network Studios. It was slated to premiere after the series finale of Ben 10: Alien Force on March 26, 2010, but instead premiered on April 23, 2010. The series finale aired on March 31, 2012.

Series overview

Episodes

Season 1 (2010)
30 Aliens - Swampfire, Jetray, Chromastone, Humungousaur, Spidermonkey, Echo Echo, Brainstorm, Alien X, Big Chill, Goop, Ultimate Humungousaur, Ultimate Spidermonkey, Ultimate Echo Echo, Ultimate Big Chill, Ultimate Swampfire, Ultimate Cannonbolt, Cannonbolt, Rath, Lodestar, Upchuck, Water Hazard, NRG, Armodrillo, Terraspin, Ampfibian, Four Arms (16 years old), Diamondhead (16 years old), Nanomech, Way Big, Ripjaws. By 10 Year Old Ben - Heatblast, Stinkfly, Four Arms, Wildmutt. By Kevin - Ultimate Kevin.
Gwendolyn Catherine Tennyson, now sixteen years old, has perfected her knowledge of her innate magical/anodite abilities in just one year.
Bivalian, Pand'r, Andreas, Galapagus and Ra'ad each have power over the first five of the main elements of Nature- Water, Fire, Earth, Air and Aether/Quintessence- giving Ben Tennyson the exact same elemental skills as Water Hazard, NRG, Armadrillo, Terraspin and Ampfibian.
The origins of top-level magicians Hex and his niece Charmcaster are explained; their home world is Legerdomain from which all things and beings magical, supernatural, occultism  and mysticism is derived.

Season 2 (2011)
35 Aliens - Swampfire, Jetray, Chromastone, Humungousaur, SpiderMonkey, Echo-Echo, Brainstorm, Alien X, Big Chill, Goop, Ultimate Humungousaur, Ultimate SpiderMonkey, Ultimate Echo-Echo, Ultimate Big Chill, Ultimate Swampfire, Ultimate Cannonbolt, Cannonbolt, Fasttrack, Rath, Lodestar, Murk Upchuck, Water Hazard, NRG, Armodrillo, Terraspin, Amphibian, Four-Arms(16 Years old), Diamond Head (16 Years old), Nanomech, Way Big, Ripjaws(16 Years old), Wildmutt (16 Years old), Ultimate Wildmutt, ChamAlien, Heatblast (16 Years old).By Ben 10,000 - Arctiguana, Spitter, Clockwork, Ultimate Ben.
It is revealed that the events of the live-action Race Against Time movie took place in an alternate reality that is entirely separate from the original show.
We see how Maxwell Tennyson, as a seventeen-year-old teen, first met his estranged anodite wife Verdona nearly half a century ago; however never their marriage and time with their sons Franklin and Carl.

Season 3 (2011–12)
39 Aliens - Swampfire, Jetray, Chromastone, Humungousaur, SpiderMonkey, Echo-Echo, Brainstorm, Alien X, Big Chill, Goop, Ultimate Humungousaur, Ultimate SpiderMonkey, Clockwork, Ultimate Echo-Echo, Ultimate Big Chill, Ultimate Swampfire, Ultimate Cannonbolt, Ultimate Way Big, Cannonbolt, Fasttrack, Rath, Lodestar, Murk Upchuck, Jury Rigg, Water Hazard, NRG, Armodrillo, Terraspin, Amphibian, Eatle, Four-Arms(16 Years old), Diamond Head (16 Years old), Nanomech, Way Big, Ripjaws(16 Years old), Wildmutt (16 Years old), Ultimate Wildmutt, ChamAlien, Heatblast (16 Years old).
Kevin Ethan Levin is absent in "Catch a Falling Star".
Gwen Tennyson, being one-quarter anodite who is almost fully in tune with her increasingly powerful magical and psychic/extrasensory abilities, is considered to be the strongest being in the known universe, according to "the Dagon" himself.
Dagon makes a debut in the series and the true motive of all forever knights is revealed.

Crossover Special (2011)
Following Dwayne McDuffie's death.

DVD releases

See also
 List of Ben 10 episodes
 List of Ben 10: Alien Force episodes
 List of Ben 10: Omniverse episodes
 List of Ben 10 (2016 TV series) episodes

Notes

References

Lists of American children's animated television series episodes
Lists of Cartoon Network television series episodes
2010s television-related lists
Ultimate